Prince Désiré Gnahoré Gouano (born 24 December 1993), known as Prince-Désir Gouano, is a French professional footballer who plays as a defender. He primarily plays as a centre-back in a four or three man back-line.

Club career

Le Havre
Born in Paris, Gouano began his career with the CFF Paris youth academy. In 2007, he was transferred to Le Havre at the age of 14. At Le Havre, he worked his way through the club's youth academy until 2010, when he joined his team's B squad. Gouano went on to make 12 CFA appearances in Group A of the 2010–11 season, prior to earning his debut for the first team. On 27 May 2011, he made his professional debut with Le Havre's senior team in a league match against Metz. That would ultimately prove to be his first and only first team appearance for the French outfit, prior to his transfer to Italian champions, Juventus in the summer of 2011.

Juventus
On 31 July 2011, Gouano was officially transferred to Juventus, where he was enlisted into the club's Primavera youth team, where he was a first team regular in the side that won 2012 Viareggio Tournament. Gouano was promoted from the youth academy ahead of the 2012–13 Serie A campaign, though he was loaned out to Serie B outfit, Virtus Lanciano on 29 August 2012. He was joined by fellow Juventus loanee Nicola Leali just two days later. During his loan spell with the newly promoted Serie B side, Gouano made just 1 first team appearance in a 0–3 home loss to Bari on 17 November 2012 after spending much of his time with the club's youth squad. Juventus recalled the player during the January market, and loaned him to fellow Serie B side, Vicenza Calcio in a multiple player part-exchange deal. On 25 August 2013, it was announced that Gouano was again sent on loan at Dutch side RKC Waalwijk for the remainder of the season.

Atalanta
On 2 September 2013, it was announced that Gouano was transferred from Juventus to Atalanta, along with Edoardo Ceria, as part of the deal that Juve signed Luca Barlocco. On 10 September 2013, it was announced that Gouano would still be sent on loan at Dutch side RKC Waalwijk for the remainder of the season.

In June 2014, Atalanta acquired Gouano outright by selling James Troisi back to Juventus.

Bolton Wanderers (loan)
Gouano signed for Bolton Wanderers on 6 August 2015.

Amiens
On 2 July 2017, Atalanta announced that the club had sold Gouano to Ligue 1 newcomer Amiens SC.

International career
Gouano is a France youth international, having earned caps at under-18 and under-19 level.

Career statistics

Club

Honours
Juventus
Viareggio Tournament: 2012
Supercoppa Italiana: 2012

References

External links
 
 Voetbal International profile 
 
 

1993 births
Living people
Association football central defenders
French footballers
French expatriate footballers
French sportspeople of Ivorian descent
Footballers from Paris
Le Havre AC players
Juventus F.C. players
L.R. Vicenza managers
S.S. Virtus Lanciano 1924 players
Atalanta B.C. players
RKC Waalwijk players
Rio Ave F.C. players
Vitória S.C. players
Bolton Wanderers F.C. players
Amiens SC players
Ligue 1 players
Ligue 2 players
Serie B players
Eredivisie players
Primeira Liga players
English Football League players
France youth international footballers
Expatriate footballers in Italy
Expatriate footballers in the Netherlands
Expatriate footballers in Portugal
Expatriate footballers in England
French football managers